Fairfax Hall, also known as Hotel Brunswick, Brandon Hotel, or Fairfax Hall School, is a historic building located at Waynesboro, Virginia. It was built in 1890, and is a -story, very long and rambling resort hotel building in the shingled mode of the Queen Anne style.  It has an irregular symmetry with towers at either end of the facade, a one-story porte cochere, a distinctive octagonal belvedere and cupola, and glassed in first story porches.  Also on the property is a contributing gymnasium, built in 1926 in the European Renaissance style.  It was originally occupied by the Brandon Hotel resort. The Brandon closed in 1913 but the building reopened as a school. In 1920 the school became Fairfax Hall, a junior college and preparatory school for girls.  After the school closed in 1975, it was leased by the Virginia Department of Corrections as a training academy but then purchased and reopened as a retirement home.

It was listed on the National Register of Historic Places in 1982.

Former students of the college and preparatory school for girls include film star Martha Hyer, musician Nikki Hornsby and politician Julia Brownley.

References

External links
Fairfax Hall
Fairfax Hall school history
Fairfax Hall our history

Hotel buildings on the National Register of Historic Places in Virginia
School buildings on the National Register of Historic Places in Virginia
Queen Anne architecture in Virginia
Renaissance Revival architecture in Virginia
Hotel buildings completed in 1890
Buildings and structures in Waynesboro, Virginia
National Register of Historic Places in Waynesboro, Virginia